Infanta Margareta Teresa in a Peach Dress is a 1653-1654 painting by Velázquez, one of five portraits he painted of Margaret Theresa of Spain. It is now in the Kunsthistorisches Museum in Vienna.

Margareta Teresa
1654 paintings